is a Japanese footballer currently playing as a defender for Kagoshima United.

Career statistics

Club
.

Notes

References

External links

1999 births
Living people
People from Kumamoto
Association football people from Kumamoto Prefecture
Japanese footballers
Association football defenders
J3 League players
Roasso Kumamoto players
Kagoshima United FC players